Ampedus pomonae is a species of click beetles native to Europe.

References

Elateridae
Beetles described in 1830
Beetles of Europe